Vokesimurex malabaricus is a species of sea snail, a marine gastropod mollusk in the family Muricidae, the murex snails or rock snails.

Description
The shell of an adult specimen grows to a length of 85 mm.

Distribution
This marine species can be found in the Persian Gulf and in the Pacific Ocean along Indonesia.

References

External links
  Ponder W.F. & Vokes E.H. (1988) A revision of the Indo-West Pacific fossil and Recent species of Murex s.s. and Haustellum (Mollusca: Gastropoda: Muricidae). Records of the Australian Museum suppl.8: 1–160.
 

Gastropods described in 1894
Vokesimurex